Henry Cavendish, 2nd Duke of Newcastle-upon-Tyne, KG, PC (24 June 1630 – 26 July 1691), styled Lord Henry Cavendish until 1659, and Viscount Mansfield from 1659, was an English politician who sat in the House of Commons from 1660 to 1676, and then inherited the dukedom.

Cavendish was the only surviving son of William Cavendish, 1st Duke of Newcastle and his first wife, Elizabeth Basset. His maternal grandparents were William Basset and Judith Austen, daughter of Thomas Austen.

After the Restoration of the Monarchy he was appointed Master of the Robes (June 1660–62) and a Gentleman of the Bedchamber (1662–68).

In April 1660, Lord Mansfield was elected Member of Parliament (MP) for Derbyshire in the Convention Parliament. He was elected MP for Northumberland in 1661 for the Cavalier Parliament.

In 1676 he inherited the title of Duke of Newcastle and the family seats of Welbeck Abbey, Bolsover Castle and Nottingham Castle on the death of his father and was invested a Knight of the Garter in 1677.

He died in 1691, leaving no surviving male heir and thus the dukedom became extinct. Welbeck Abbey and other East Midlands estates passed to his favourite daughter Margaret, who had married John Holles, for whom the dukedom was recreated in 1694. The bequest was unsuccessfully contested by Cavendish's other daughters.

Family
In 1652, Henry married Frances Pierrepont (b. 1 September 1630 in Thoresby, Nottinghamshire, d. 23 September 1695 in London), daughter of The Hon. William Pierrepont (who was the son of Robert Pierrepont, 1st Earl of Kingston-upon-Hull), and they had six children:
Lady Elizabeth Cavendish (1654–1734), known as the 'Mad Duchess', who married firstly Christopher Monck, 2nd Duke of Albemarle; no issue. She married secondly Ralph Montagu, 1st Duke of Montagu; no issue.
Lady Frances Cavendish (25 June 1660 – 4 February 1690), who married John Campbell, 2nd Earl of Breadalbane and Holland (19 November 1662 – 23 February 1752) before 1690; no issue.
Lady Margaret Cavendish (22 October 1661 – 24 December 1716), who married John Holles, 1st Duke of Newcastle-upon-Tyne on 1 March 1690 and had issue. (This was the second creation of the dukedom in 1694 after the first became extinct in 1691).
Henry Cavendish, Earl of Ogle (19 January 1663 – 1 November 1680), who married Lady Elizabeth Percy on 27 March 1679; no issue. In accordance with his marriage settlement, he adopted the surname of Percy in lieu of his patronymic. However he died the following year and was buried in the parish church at the Percy seat of Petworth.
Lady Catherine Cavendish (14 January 1665 – 20 April 1712), who married Thomas Tufton, 6th Earl of Thanet on 14 August 1684 and had issue.
Lady Arabella Cavendish (19 August 1673 – 4 June 1698), who married Charles Spencer, 3rd Earl of Sunderland on 12 January 1695 and had issue.

The department of Manuscripts and Special Collections, The University of Nottingham holds a number of papers relating to the 2nd Duke of Newcastle: the Cavendish Papers (Pw 1), part of the Portland (Welbeck) Collection, includes some of his personal papers; and the Newcastle (Clumber) Collection (Ne) includes estate papers and family settlements from the time of the 2nd Duke.

References

External links
Biography of Henry Cavendish, with links to online catalogues

|-

|-

|-

|-

|-

|-

1630 births
1691 deaths
People from Welbeck
12
10
Henry Cavendish, 02nd Duke of Newcastle-upon-Tyne
Mansfield, Henry Cavendish, Viscount
Lord-Lieutenants of Northumberland
Lord-Lieutenants of Nottinghamshire
Lord-Lieutenants of the East Riding of Yorkshire
Lord-Lieutenants of the North Riding of Yorkshire
Lord-Lieutenants of the West Riding of Yorkshire
Members of the Privy Council of England
English MPs 1660
English MPs 1661–1679
Knights of the Garter